A Session with The Dave Clark Five is the UK debut album by the English pop rock band the Dave Clark Five and was released in the United Kingdom in April 1964 on EMI's Columbia Records (see 1964 in music). The album consists of the single "Can't You See That She's Mine" along with covers of "Rumble" by Link Wray & His Ray Men, "On Broadway" by the Drifters, and the Walt Disney song "Zip-a-Dee-Doo-Dah". It peaked at number 3 on the UK Albums Chart.

Reception
In a retrospective review published on AllMusic, music critic Bruce Eder wrote "As the group's first venture in making an LP, it's not as strong as their later efforts, though it does show off their range around the sound that would make them international stars. The lack of the presence of a hit single, however, leaves it weaker than most of the group's American-released LPs."

Track listing

Charts

Personnel
The Dave Clark Five
Dave Clark - drums, backing vocals
Mike Smith - keyboards, lead vocals
Lenny Davidson - lead guitar, backing vocals
Rick Huxley - bass, backing vocals
Denis Payton - saxes, backing vocals

Additional personnel
Adrian Clark - producer
Les Reed - musical direction on "Theme Without a Name"
Bruce Fleming - photography

See also
The Dave Clark Five discography

References

1964 debut albums
The Dave Clark Five albums
EMI Columbia Records albums